Pseudocephalini is a tribe of beetles in the subfamily Cerambycinae. They are most commonly found in Australia.

Genus
 Cyclocranium van der Poll, 1891
 Formicomimus Aurivillius, 1897
 Pseudocephalus Newman, 1842

See also
Cyclocranium swierstrae

References

Cerambycinae
Beetle tribes